Dídac Costa (born 22 December 1980 in Barcelona, Spain) is a yachtsman who competes in ocean racing. He was the first Catalan and the second Spanish yachtsman to finish the Vendée Globe, the non-stop solo round-the-world sailing world race. He was the first Spanish yachtsman to complete the two IMOCA 60 class round-the-world yacht races: solo in the 2016–2017 Vendée Globe and double-handed at the Barcelona World Race 2014–15. He is the protagonist of the feature documentary Open Ocean (2021), which chronicles his 2016-17 and 2020-21 Vendée Globe campaigns. 
Nationality

Racing career 
He started his racing career in the Mini Class, taking part in 2011 in the Mini Transat 6.50, the solo transatlantic yacht race from La Rochelle to Salvador de Bahia where participants sail a 6.50 meter length yacht. He finished in 19th place. In 2014 he participated in the Barcelona World Race, the IMOCA 60 class double-handed non-stop round-the-world regatta. He sailed with Aleix Gelabert on the One Planet One Ocean yacht, formerly Kingfisher which was built for English yachtswoman Ellen MacArthur to race in the Vendée Globe in 2000. Costa and Gelabert finished in fourth place, sailing 27,791 nautical miles in 98 days, 9 hours, 12 minutes and 9 seconds.

In 2016, he took part in the eighth edition of the Vendée Globe, the only non-stop solo round the world race without assistance on IMOCA 60 class starting and finishing in Les Sables-d'Olonne. He raced aboard One Planet One Ocean again, under the insignia of the Royal Barcelona Maritime Club and Spanish ensign. 18 out of the 29 participants completed the race. Costa made it in 108 days, 19 hours, 50 minutes and 45 seconds, sailing 24,500 nautical miles and finishing in 14th place. He became the second Spanish yachtsman to complete the race, 24 years after José Luis Ugarte.

Track record 
 2020: 20th, 2020–2021 Vendée Globe
 2017: 14th, 2016–2017 Vendée Globe
 2016: Winner, Mare Nostrum
 2015: 4th, Barcelona World Race (co-skipper Aleix Gelabert) 
 2013: Winner, San Remo Mini Solo
 2013: 3rd, Grand Premio d’Italia
 2011: 19th, Mini Transat

References

External links 
 Official website
 Global Ocean website

1980 births
Living people
Vendée Globe finishers
Solo class sailors
Spanish male sailors (sport)
Single-handed circumnavigating sailors
Real Club Marítimo de Barcelona sailors
2016 Vendee Globe sailors
2020 Vendee Globe sailors
Spanish Vendee Globe sailors